Marc Arlen Anderson (born December 1, 1945) holds degrees in chemistry from the University of Wisconsin–Madison (BS) and Johns Hopkins University (MA and PhD). Anderson is advisor - principal research at the IMDEA Energy Institute. He also serves as director of SolRayo Inc.

References

External links
Biography at the University of Wisconsin College of Engineering

1945 births
Living people
21st-century American chemists
University of Wisconsin–Madison College of Letters and Science alumni
Johns Hopkins University alumni
University of Wisconsin–Madison faculty
People from Monroe, Wisconsin